SF9 (shortened from Sensational Feeling 9) is a South Korean boy band formed by FNC Entertainment and the company's first dance boy group. Consisting of nine members, they debuted on October 5, 2016, with the release of their first single album, Feeling Sensation.

History

Pre-debut and NEOZ School 
The group first performed in Japan on December 11, 2015. The group had consisted of 11 members at that time. In May 2016, they participated as "NEOZ Dance" in FNC Entertainment's survival show d.o.b (Dance or Band), competing against NEOZ Band (later known as Honeyst). They later won the show with their first song "K.O.", which was later featured in the Feeling Sensation single album. They were renamed SF9 in August.

2016: Debut with Feeling Sensation 
SF9's debut single album Feeling Sensation with lead single "Fanfare" was released on October 5, 2016. The album debuted at No. 8, and peaked at No. 6 on the Gaon Album Chart. They made their official stage debut on October 6, 2016, on M Countdown. The music video ranked at No. 6 on the Yin Yue Tai weekly chart and ranked seventh on the Yin Yue Tai Monthly Chart. Their promotions for "Fanfare" ended on November 6, 2016, on Inkigayo. The group then started the promotion of their second song of the album, "K.O." on November 15, 2016. The debut single album "Feeling Sensation" was ranked 78th for album sales in 2016.

On December 22, they released a music video as a gift to their fans with the title "So Beautiful". The song was originally an OST of their interactive web-drama Click Your Heart. "So Beautiful" is a digitally released single.

2017: Career breakthrough, Japanese debut and commercial success 
Their first EP, Burning Sensation, was released on February 6. It landed at number six on the February 15 Billboard World Albums Chart.

On April 4, it was reported that SF9 would have their second comeback, just two months after they concluded "Roar" promotions.

On April 7, SF9 held their first sold-out showcase in Japan in preparation for their Japan debut.

On April 18, SF9 released their new six-song EP, titled Breaking Sensation, which includes the title track "Easy Love". On the same day, the album ranked number two on the U.S. K-Pop Album Chart.

On June 6, SF9 debuted in Japan. On June 7, the Japanese version of their debut single "Fanfare" was released. It ranked number one on Tower Records Chart for single albums and number four on the Oricon Chart.

They performed at KCON 2017 in New York and L.A.

On October 12, the group's third EP, Knights of the Sun, was released. Following the release of their EP, SF9 held a three-stop U.S. solo tour titled "2017 SF9 Be My Fantasy in U.S.A" stopping in Dallas, Seattle, and Boston during November.

In December, they released their first Japanese studio album, Sensational Feeling Nine.

2018: New EPs and rising success 
SF9's fourth EP, Mamma Mia! was released on February 26. On May 23, they released their third Japanese single, "Mamma Mia!". To promote the single, a Japanese tour titled "SF9 Zepp Tour 2018 MAMMA MIA!" was held in Osaka, Aichi, and Tokyo on May 29, May 30, and June 1, respectively. In August, they held a South American fanmeeting tour.

On July 31, they came back with their fifth EP, Sensuous, with the lead single "Now or Never". On August 23, they held a fanmeeting in Mexico at Auditorio Blackberry of Mexico City and on August 25 and 26 in Brazil at Tropical Butantã of São Paulo. On September 22, they held a fanmeeting in Taipei.

On October 27, SF9 held their first domestic concert, "Dreamer", at Yes24 Live Concert Hall.

2019: Narcissus, RPM, and UNLIMITED Tour 
SF9's sixth EP, Narcissus, was released on February 20 with the lead single "Enough". One month later, SF9 released their second Japanese album Illuminate To promote their album, a Japanese tour titled "SF9 2019 ZEPP TOUR “ILLUMINATE” was held in Tokyo, Nagoya and in Namba on April 2, April 4 and 5, respectively.

Following their Japanese Tour, SF9 set out on their "2019 SF9 USA – Europe Live Tour ‘UNLIMITED," a ten-stop tour traveling over the United States (Chicago, New York, Atlanta, Los Angeles) and Europe (Moscow, Warsaw, Berlin, Amsterdam, Paris, London).

They were selected as the new CF models for Korean chicken joint Toreore, alongside actress Shin Ye-eun.

On May 15, they participated at "KCON 2019 JAPAN".

On June 17, they released their seventh EP, RPM, with the lead single of the same name. that consist of 6 tracks. On July 7 they participated at "KCON 2019 New York".

2020: First Collection, 9loryUS, and mainstream success
SF9's first Korean studio album, First Collection, was released on January 7 with the lead single "Good Guy". They broke multiple sales, charts and music video records during this comeback, making this comeback their most successful yet. This included selling over 100,000 copies of their album, all songs charting on the Melon Realtime Chart, and their music video reaching over 40 million views.

On January 16, SF9 took their first ever music show win with "Good Guy" on M Countdown. They also took their 2nd win the next day on Music Bank, which was their first on a major television network. On January 30, they took their 3rd win for the song on M Countdown, with over 10,000 points. Throughout the "Good Guy" promotion, they also placed 2nd on Inkigayo twice, which gave them their first ever nominations on this show.

On July 6, SF9 released their eighth EP, 9loryUS, with the lead single "Summer Breeze". They took their first win for "Summer Breeze" on SBS MTV's The Show on July 14.

To celebrate SF9's fourth anniversary, they released their special album Special History Book on October 5, consisting of three tracks including the lead single "Shine Together".

At the end of the year, "Good Guy" was nominated for "Best Dance - Male" at the Melon Music Awards, marking their first ever MMA nomination.

2021: Kingdom: Legendary War, Turn Over and Rumination
On March 2, all nine members of SF9 renewed their contracts with FNC Entertainment.

SF9 participated in Kingdom: Legendary War, a competition show alongside five other K-pop boy groups, beginning in April 2021.

On July 5, SF9 released their ninth EP, Turn Over, with the lead single "Tear Drop".

On November 22, SF9 released their tenth EP, Rumination, with the lead single "Trauma". They took their first win for the song "Trauma" on Music Bank on December 3, with a score of 4971 points.

On December 30, SF9 released the digital single "Savior" through Universe Music for the mobile application, Universe.

2022–present: Military service, The Best 〜Dear Fantasy〜 and The Wave OF9 
From January 21-23, 2022, SF9 had 4 shows of their third solo concert "Live Fantasy 3: IMPERFECT" in the Olympic Hall, Seoul.

On February 5, 2022, it was announced that Inseong will be enlisting for his mandatory military service on March 21, serving as part of the military band.
On February 14, it was announced that Youngbin will also be enlisting for his mandatory military service on March 29, serving as an active-duty soldier in the 27th division of the army.

On June 29, 2022, SF9 released their Japanese best album The Best 〜Dear Fantasy〜.

On June 24, 2022, it was announced that Rowoon would not be taking part in the group’s promotions for their eleventh EP, The Wave OF9, which was released in July 13, and SF9 made a comeback as a six-member group.

On October 5, 2022, FNC announced that SF9 will be holding a 'Delight Tour' (2022 SF9 LIVE FANTASY #4 DELIGHT TOUR) in five US cities. Starts in Seoul on November 18, New York on the 30th of the same month. and Chicago on December 2.

On December 20, 2022, FNC Entertainment announced that SF9 will be releasing its twelfth EP, The Piece OF9 on January 9, 2023, with Rowoon rejoining the 6 other members.

On February 13, 2023, FNC announced that Jae-yoon will enter military service on March 21, 2023, where he will attend basic training at the 3rd Infantry Division.

Members
 Youngbin (영빈) – leader, lead rapper, main dancer
 Inseong (인성) – main vocalist
 Jaeyoon (재윤) – lead-vocalist
 Dawon (다원) – sub-vocalist
 Rowoon (로운) – lead vocalist
 Zuho (주호) – main rapper
 Yoo Taeyang (유태양) – sub-vocalist, main dancer
 Hwiyoung (휘영) – lead rapper
 Chani (찬희) – sub-rapper, main dancer

Timeline

Discography

Studio albums

Compilation albums

Extended plays

Single albums

Singles

Other charted songs

Music videos

Filmography

Television drama

Reality shows

Awards and nominations

Notes

References

External links
 

South Korean boy bands
FNC Entertainment artists
2016 establishments in South Korea
South Korean dance music groups
South Korean electronic musicians
South Korean hip hop groups
Musical groups established in 2016